MV Flevoborg is a cargo ship registered in the Netherlands and operated by Wagenborg.  Completed in 2010, Flevoborg ran aground in the St. Lawrence River off Sainte-Croix, Quebec in 2017.

Description
The vessel has two holds and has a capacity of  grain/bale.

Service history
Constructed by Ferus Smit in Leer, Germany with the yard number 392, the ship was completed in March 2010. Flevoborg is registered in the Netherlands with its home port at Delfzijl and operated by Wagenborg. On 21 June 2017, Flevoborg lost power while transiting the Saint Lawrence River. The vessel was taking a cargo of corn from Montreal and was off Sainte-Croix, Quebec when it ran aground. The vessel was re-floated by changing the levels of water in the ballast and the rising tide. The engine did not restart and tugboats arrived to tow Flevoborg to Quebec City, arriving on 22 June to undergo inspection and repairs. While aground, the vessel had been out of the main channel and no oil leaked.

Citations

External links

2010 ships
Cargo ships
Maritime incidents in 2017